Chris Martin (born 1954) is an American abstract painter who lives and works in Brooklyn, New York and the Catskills region of New York State.

Early life and education
Chris Martin was born in Washington, DC, in 1954. His grandmother was a landscape painter. He grew up in Washington, and works in Brooklyn, New York. He studied painting at Yale University but did not complete the course; in the 1990s he attended the School of Visual Arts and left with a degree in art therapy. He worked as an art therapist for some fifteen years.

Work
He makes colorful, abstract paintings, often with elements of collage and text. His work is casualist, and employs various media. He considers it to be influenced by the Catskill Mountains, which he often visited when young.

An early member of the Williamsburg art scene, he still maintains the same studio he has had since the mid-1980s, in what used to be a florist's freezer.

References

Further reading 

 Dan Nadel, Glenn O'Brien, Nancy Princenthal, Trinie Dalton, Chris Martin (2018). Chris Martin Paintings Milan: Skira.
 Elodie Evers, Lars Bang Larsen, Alexander Koch, Bob Nickas, Gregor Jansen (2012). Chris Martin: Staring into the Sun (exhibition catalogue). Köln: Walther König. 

Painters from Washington, D.C.
1954 births
20th-century American painters
American male painters
21st-century American painters
21st-century American male artists
American abstract artists
Abstract painters
American contemporary painters
Casualist artists
Living people
20th-century American male artists